The legend of the Duke of Wellington at Pau, France, first appeared in a 1907 publication coinciding with the 65th anniversary of the founding of the Pau Hunt, and quickly developed into a tale about the origins of Fox hunting in Béarn. After the Peninsular War, Wellington spent just one night at Pau, May 18, 1814, stopping on the route from Toulouse to Madrid. The tale of a more lengthy and marked presence developed 90 years later as a prank that regular winter colonists played on newcomers. The tale found its way into touristic marketing publications, memoires and academic publications during challenging times. Despite contradictory historical evidence, it has developed into Bearnese folklore. Worldwide, is difficult to find any 21st century historical passage about the 19th century "English" tourist colony at Pau that does not present this legend.

Wellington in the Southwest of France 
During the Peninsular War, 45,000 British, Spanish and Portuguese infantry and calvary wintered in the Basque Country awaiting provisions and preparing what they intended to be the final campaign to rout Marshal Soult's troops from the Iberian Peninsula. Near and around the port of Saint-Jean-de-Luz, some officers, including Wellington hunted foxes and hares - a perfect sport for calvary training. Soult's troops held east of the Bidouze river, from Saint-Jean-Pied-de-Port, northwest to the port of Bayonne, with Soult's headquarters at Peyrehorade. Between February 14 and February 18, Wellington's forces pushed Soult's behind the Gave d'Oloron permitting General Hope to siege the port of Bayonne by February 25. Two days later Wellington was injured during the Battle of Orthez, spending the night there while the battle continued until dusk driving Soult's defense north to Sault-de-Navailles. Wellington, who couldn't ride and was down with a fever, established his headquarters at Saint Sever on March 1. Headquarter baggage arrived on March 4 directly from Saint-Jean-de-Luz, including legal and administrative staff, 1,200 animals, spouses, guests, prisoners and Wellington's famous pack of hounds, where they remained until the bridge over the Adour river was repaired. On March 7 from Saint-Sever, two divisions crossed the Adour to liberate Bordeaux and another was sent under General Henry Fane to liberate Pau. Both Bordeaux and Pau welcomed a possible Bourbon Restoration and were easily secured. Fane delivered Wellington's proclamation making Pau's town council responsible for its own security, leaving British troops able to rejoin the campaign.  Wellington installed his headquarters at Aire-sur-l'Adour on March 10, where he remained until March 17th awaiting Spanish reinforcements, and the return of a division from Bordeaux along with additional provisions. At Aire-sur-l'Adour, Wellington's hounds first went out on March 12, but it is uncertain whether he had recovered well enough to go out with them that day. One month after the Battle of Toulouse, British troops began leaving Toulouse for embarkment at the port of Bordeaux while Wellington left on a diplomatic mission to Madrid, passing through and spending one night at Pau, where "Milord" was welcomed on May 18 as a hero.

The Legend(s) of Wellington 

The legend of Wellington has several variations - one with Wellington regularly playing checkers with Napoleon's soldiers in a local valley. The most prevalent early versions recount Wellington having established his headquarters along with his stables and pack of hounds at Orthez where, while hunting, the general was ambushed by French hussars and defended himself with a pistol. Again from Orthez, there is a version claiming Wellington sent calvary out to chase off French calvary for a distance of 43 miles (65 km), returning to report they had discovered what would become the Pau Hunt country. Other legend versions add  British and French officers cordially parting ways ending their skirmish with a foxhunt. The English language version takes a turn, naming Wellington Pau's first Master of the Hounds, while the French version goes onto to name some early Pau Hunt founders as returning officers; although, those named weren't yet of age in 1814 and the founders mentioned never served in the military. Later legend versions state Wellington's 1814 Scottish military had hit some balls around along the Gave de Pau to explain the presence of the Pau Golf Club in 1856, and have the same generational discrepancy: the eldest Pau Golf Club founder, General William Nelson Hutchinson (1803-1895) turned eleven in 1814. 

In 1956, historian Raymond Ritter shuns  the development of the legend in an article celebrating the 100th anniversary of the Pau Golf Club:

20th century origin and versions of the legend

1907, Charles de Salverte 
Near the opening of hunt season in November, the local tourist newspaper normally published the history of the Pau Hunt with few or slight variations from year to year. There is no mention of Wellington or his soldiers contributing to the development of sport or tourism at Pau in any 19th century document. An article edited by J. Aparici de Valparda on November 27, 1892, is cited in Lord Howth's "Leicestershire in France or the Field at Pau", translated into French by Charles de Salverte, who wrote using the pseudonym, "Thya Hillaud". The second part of this 1907  500-copy limited edition by Charles de Salverte, "Les P.H. Modernes sous le mastership de C.H. Ridgway esq." includes the first known version of the legend:

1912, Harry Worcester Smith, Master of the Grafton Hounds 
In a memoire, "A Sporting Tour through Ireland, England, Wales and France", dated 1925, Harry Worcester Smith reminisces about "Hunting in France", or more specifically at Pau in 1912. Smith recounts one morning with his host, Frederick Henry Prince:

c 1912, Baron Robert Lejeune, former Master of the Pau Hounds
An annex to the Pau Hunt 1928 - 1939 archives includes translated notes of a speech given by Baron Lejeune. The date is unknown; however, it is after the end of the 1888 - 1908 tenure of Henri Faisans as mayor of Pau and probably before the publication the 1917 publication of Arthur Smyth Este, not mentioned in the address:

1917, Arthur Smyth Este, aka Baron d'Este, former Master of the Pau Hounds
Pau had few visitors during World War I. Many permanent residents left along with the tourist colony that sacrificed several of its dedicated regulars in the war. Este, who maintained a scrapbook related to horse racing, the Pau Hunt and its subscribers between 1860 and 1920, had several articles about the history of the Pau Hunt including the de Valparda article from 1892. Este was the president of the English Club at the time the 1917 publication. His version of the legend of Wellington seems to be a blend between the de Salverte and the Lejeune versions. The Este versions adds the number of hunters and hounds, flirtations with the young bride of the hotel owner, the chemin de Henri IV and the town of Nay. The following is a translation of the text added as a preamble to the Valparda article and published in 1917:

1930, Desbois, Pau-Hunt
A typed, 21 page document entitled, "Pau-Hunt" signed January 18, 1930, by Desbois is located in at the Communal Archives of Pau, this time taking place in November:
Desbois confuses Master Charles Whyte with his the military brother Col. White - neither of whom have been identified. He does not make a connection between Wellington and Col. Whyte or Sir Oxenden.

1930, H.E. Gay
An article with the legend of Wellington appeared in the European Edition of The Chicago Tribune on April 11, 1930, "Pau : Final Hunt Race Attracts Society to Turf at Pau", eliminating flirtations at the hotel, stating Wellington's stables included race horses, changing the town of Nay to "May Heath" and replacing hussars with dragoons:

1930s, Baily's Hunting Directory
The 1930s annual editions published the following in its listing from the Pau Hunt:

1932, Viscount Henri Piscatory de Vaufreland, Secretary of the Pau Hunt
Texte from an article Foxhunting and horse racing in Bearn appeared in the 1932-33 Revue de Béarn N° 6, Academie de Béarn. The Battle of Orthez is not mentioned.:

1935 and 1937, Col. T. Bentley Mott
Colonel Mott twice published identical texts of the legend of Wellington in descriptions of the Pau Hunt. The first was an article, published in Country Life magazine in January 1935, "With Frederick Prince at Pau" and the second a chapter of his memoir, "Twenty Years as a Military Attaché", with the heading "The Duke of Wellington M.F.H.". The Mott version places the British hunting between Orthez and Pau in January 1814 - behind enemy lines - when the French still held east of the Bidouze river:

1965 and 1970, Joseph Duloum
A 1965 article on the origins of the British colony at Pau stated half-pay soldiers from Wellington's 1814 campaign returned to the region. Duloum cited three publications, noting they were not based on historical documents, but tradition and legend. The article then describes a well-documented British colony installed at Pau between 1835 and 1840 during the First Carlist War composed of some soldiers and families of the British Auxiliary Legion, diplomats and businessmen. Those at Pau were out of harms way from the uprising in the adjoining Basque Country or used Pau to access a relatively safe alternative war-time route to Madrid using the Somport pass. Duloum does not repeat the legend of Wellington in his 1970 dissertation, "Les Anglaise dans les Pyrénées et les Débuts du Tourisme Pyrénéen (1736 – 1896)", but recounts a peaceful securing of Pau by General Sir Henry Fane with one infantry batallion arriving early in the morning of May 7th 1814 and departing the 9th and 10th of May.

1976, Pierre Tucoo-Chala
In an article published in a local historical revue, "Pau in 1841-1843, description of a tourist town by two Englishwomen", respected historian Tucoo-Chala, presents and compares the works of two authors; Sarah Stickney Ellis and Louisa Stuart Costello. Early in the article, he wrote a fleeting reference to Wellington in the Pyrenees linked to an album of lithographs published by William Oliver, who was born in 1804. Tucoo-Chala implied that Oliver dedicated the album to Wellington, however, the dedication was by his publishers and the reason is unknown. In his observations of the two authors' works, Tucoo-Chala states that retired soldiers had been at Pau; however, the works of Ellis and Costello make no mention of active or retired British soldiers, but only of French military stationed at the Pau castle. Ellis (page 275) states that afflicted (French) soldiers could have the baths administered gratis. Tucoo-Chala's subsequent publications never again attempt to link Wellington with tourism at Pau.

1977, Georges Claverie, Master of the Pau Drag Hounds
After World War II, the Pau Hunt was reconstituted as La Société d'Encouragement Pau Hunt Drags concentrating their focus on drag hunting. Master Claverie submitted an article to Le Vénerie N° 45, "The Pau Hunt Drag Hunt": his version stating Wellington's armies had bivouacked near Pau where officers had fox hunted. The Claverie version also pretends that two of the officers who returned; Colonel White [sic] and Sir Henry Chudleigh Oxenden, founded the Pau Hunt Drags - the name of the association - and inadvertently implying they may have drag hunted, but the first recorded drag hunt at Pau didn't occur until 1847 under Master Jasper Hall Livingston. Claverie may have read about Whyte and Oxenden in the 1930 Desbois document. Master Charles Whyte's brother Colonel Whyte brother was active in 1847 and probably too young to have hunted in the region in 1814.

Notes

External links
 Views of the Pyrenees by William Oliver, 1843

References

Sports clubs established in the 19th century
Sports clubs established in 1842
Dog sports
Equestrian sports
Hunting
Hunting with hounds
Fox hunting
Arthur Wellesley, 1st Duke of Wellington